Arthur Shapiro may refer to:

Arthur Shapiro (ecologist) (born 1946), professor of evolution and ecology at UC Davis
Arthur Shapiro (vision scientist) (born 1964), American vision scientist known for creating optical illusions
Arthur K. Shapiro (1923–1995), American psychiatrist known for his work on Tourette syndrome
Artie Shapiro (1916–2003), American jazz bassist